Bowman Brown Law (July 29, 1855 – February 3, 1916) was a Canadian politician.

Early life and education
Born in Douglas, Massachusetts, United States, the son of William and Mary Law, the father of Irish and the mother of American descent, Law was brought to Yarmouth, Nova Scotia by his parents when he was young.

Political career
A merchant, he was first elected to the House of Commons of Canada for Yarmouth in a 1902 by-election held on December 3, 1902 when the sitting MP, Thomas Barnard Flint, was appointed Clerk of the House of Commons. A Liberal, he was re-elected in 1904, 1908 and 1911.

Death
He died in the fire that destroyed the Parliament building in Ottawa on February 3, 1916.

References
 
 The Canadian Parliament; biographical sketches and photo-engravures of the senators and members of the House of Commons of Canada. Being the tenth Parliament, elected November 3, 1904
 History of Nova Scotia (Volume 3) (1916)

1855 births
1916 deaths
People from Yarmouth County
American emigrants to pre-Confederation Nova Scotia
Liberal Party of Canada MPs
Members of the House of Commons of Canada from Nova Scotia
People from Douglas, Massachusetts